Punt Bama Punt is the nickname given to the 1972 Iron Bowl football game between the Auburn Tigers and Alabama Crimson Tide, in which Auburn blocked two Alabama punts and ran them back for touchdowns to win the game.

The game was played on December 2, 1972, at Legion Field in Birmingham, Alabama. The 2nd-ranked and undefeated (10–0) Alabama team led by head coach Paul Bryant came into the game as a 14-point favorite over the Ralph "Shug" Jordan-coached Tigers, 8–1. An Alabama win meant the Tide would earn a national championship with a victory over Texas in the upcoming Cotton Bowl. For the first three and a half quarters the Tide seemed to have the game well in hand.

Alabama led 16–0 with ten minutes left in the game. With less than 10 minutes left, an Auburn drive stalled and managed only a field goal, which made it 16–3. Jordan later joked that his decision was derided by all the faithful in attendance: Auburn fans booed for the appearance of giving up, while Alabama fans joined in because the field goal ruined the point spread. On the ensuing possession Alabama was forced to punt. Auburn's Bill Newton blocked Greg Gantt's punt and his teammate David Langner ran the ball back 25 yards for an Auburn touchdown, narrowing the score to 16–10. Several minutes later, Alabama was forced to punt again. Like the previous time, Newton blocked the punt and Langner returned it for a touchdown. Gardner Jett kicked the extra point to give Auburn a 17–16 lead.

With the clock winding down, Langner intercepted an Alabama pass to stop their attempted comeback. When Langner reached the sideline, he found Jordan upset. Langner reportedly said, "But coach, I intercepted the pass", to which Jordan said, "Yeah, but our plan was to make them punt."

In June 2007, Punt Bama Punt was ranked #55 by ESPN.com in its list of the 100 defining moments of college football. In July 2007, CollegeFootballNews.com ranked the game #85 on its list of the 100 Greatest Finishes.  In August 2010, ESPN.com ranked the game as the 8th most painful outcome in college history.

Radio broadcast
Gary Sanders was the radio play-by-play announcer for Auburn football in the early 1970s, and his call of the blocked punts, particularly the last one, is familiar to many Auburn fans and has been available on vinyl records, cassette tapes and CDs sold in Auburn University bookstores through the years. The call of the first blocked punt was rather subdued, possibly because Alabama had dominated the game to that point. The call went as follows:

The call of the second blocked punt is heard more often, and was delivered with much more enthusiasm from Sanders. Additionally, others in the broadcast booth and press box can be heard screaming and yelling over Sanders call. Sanders, possibly due to being caught up in the moment, misidentified Roger Mitchell as the player who blocked the kick, when it was Bill Newton (who had also blocked the first one):

References

Additional sources
 War Eagle: A Story of Auburn Football, by Clyde Bolton; copyright 1973 by Clyde Bolton and published by The Strode Publishers, Huntsville, Alabama

1972 Southeastern Conference football season
Iron Bowl
Alabama Crimson Tide football games
Auburn Tigers football games
American football incidents
December 1972 sports events in the United States
1972 in sports in Alabama